The gorse tip moth (Agonopterix nervosa) is a smallish moth species of the family Depressariidae.

It is found in Europe and North America. 

The wingspan is 16–22 mm. Terminal joint of palpi with two blackish bands. Forewings are light brown, somewhat whitish-sprinkled, sometimes slightly reddish-tinged; numerous dark fuscous dashes; two indicating discal stigmata, between which is sometimes a line of pale scales; an obscure pale very acutely angulated fascia at 3/4. Hindwings fuscous-whitish, more fuscous posteriorly; 5 connate with stalk of 3 and 4.The larva is dark bluish -grey; lateral line orange-yellow; spots black, white-circled; head black; plate of 2 black, bisected, anterior edge whitish.

Adults fly from July to September depending on the location.

The caterpillars feed on brooms, namely of the genera Cytisus, Genista, Laburnum (golden chains) and Ulex (gorses).

Synonyms
Obsolete scientific names of the gorse tip moth are:
 Agonopteryx blackmori Busck, 1922
 Agonopterix boicella (Freyer, 1835)
 Depressaria costosa Haworth, 1811
 Tinea depunctella Hübner, [1813])
 Depressaria dryadoxena Meyrick, 1920
 Depressaria costosa ab. venosata Kautz, 1930
 Depressaria nervosa Haworth, 1811 (In older (19th-century) sources, this name is often misapplied to Depressaria daucella)
 Agonopterix rubricella Millière, 1876
 Depressaria obscurana Weber, 1945
 Tortrix spartiana Hübner, [1813]

Footnotes

References

  (2003): Markku Savela's Lepidoptera and some other life forms – Agonopterix nervosa. Version of 2008-JUL-18. Retrieved 2010-APR-24.

External links
 Agonopterix nervosa at UKmoths

Agonopterix
Moths of Europe
Moths described in 1811
Moths of North America